Kusić is a village in Serbia. It is situated in the Bela Crkva municipality, in the South Banat District, Vojvodina province. The village has a Serb ethnic majority (83.46%) and a population of 1,361 (2002 census).

Historical population

1961: 1,912
1971: 1,808
1981: 1,622
1991: 1,560

See also
List of places in Serbia
List of cities, towns and villages in Vojvodina

References

Slobodan Ćurčić, Broj stanovnika Vojvodine, Novi Sad, 1996.

External links

 Map of the Bela Crkva municipality showing the location of Kusić

Populated places in Serbian Banat
Populated places in South Banat District
Bela Crkva